Fred Sleeman (25 March 1885 – 13 November 1953) was an Australian rules footballer who played with Melbourne in the Victorian Football League (VFL).

Notes

External links 

1885 births
Australian rules footballers from Victoria (Australia)
Melbourne Football Club players
1953 deaths